The chocolate gourami (Sphaerichthys osphromenoides) is a species of gourami native to the Malay Peninsula, Sumatra, and Borneo. These fish have a chocolate colour with golden bands running down their bodies.

Taxonomy
Sphaerichthys selatanensis has sometimes been treated as a subspecies of S. osphromenoides.

Ecology
They are restricted to peat habitats. Unlike many other labyrinth fish, which breed by incubating their eggs in a bubble nest, this species is a mouthbrooder. Even more unusually, this species is a maternal mouthbrooder, with the female incubating the eggs in her mouth; all other anabantoid mouthbrooders (with the exception of its close relative Sphaerichthys selatanensis) are paternal mouthbrooders, with the male carrying the eggs and young larvae. They are omnivorous, but feed primarily on insects.

In the aquarium
They are popular aquarium fish, but are challenging to keep. Without optimum water conditions, they are susceptible to bacterial infections and skin parasites. Chocolate gouramis are best kept on their own in well-planted aquaria with gentle filtration. They require soft, acidic water; most of all, they prefer a higher temperature than most fish. Tank temperature should be maintained at 25–27 °C (77–81 °F). They are generally fussy eaters, preferring to eat live foods or freeze-dried, frozen equivalents over flake food.

References

 

Luciocephalinae
Fish of Malaysia
Fish of Indonesia
Fish of Southeast Asia
chocolate gourami
chocolate gourami